Argyresthia mesocausta is a moth of the  family Yponomeutidae. It is found in North America.

References

Moths described in 1913
Argyresthia
Moths of North America